Pterolophia subrubra is a species of beetle in the family Cerambycidae. It was described by Stephan von Breuning in 1968.

References

subrubra
Beetles described in 1968